is a railway station located in Chiebun (智恵文), Nayoro, Hokkaidō in Japan, and is operated by the Hokkaido Railway Company.

Lines Serviced
Hokkaido Railway Company
Sōya Main Line

Adjacent stations

External links
Ekikara Time Table - JR Chiebun Station

Railway stations in Hokkaido Prefecture
Railway stations in Japan opened in 1911